Ainaro is a town in East Timor, the capital of the Ainaro suco, the Ainaro administrative post and the Ainaro Municipality, and is located in the southwest part of the country. The town of Ainaro is located 78 km south of Dili, the national capital.

Destruction of Ainaro
During the Indonesian occupation from 1975 to 1999, Ainaro was home to a large contingent of Indonesian military (TNI)-backed pro-Indonesia militias in the months leading up to the 30 August 1999 referendum on independence. As a result, it suffered near-total devastation during the TNI orchestrated scorched earth operation with more than 95 percent of its buildings destroyed.

Climate

Sister cities
  Madison, United States
  Ballarat, Australia

References

External links

 Madison-Ainaro Sister City Alliance
 Cafe Timor Just Coffee

Populated places in East Timor
Ainaro Municipality